The Medvědí skála (German: Bärenstein, also Bernsteinberg) is a 924 m high mountain in the Czech part of the Ore Mountains in Central Europe.

Location and surroundings 
The mountain lies 3 kilometres southwest of Mikulovice within the municipality of Nová Ves v Horách and, together with the Lesenská pláň (Hübladung), forms the largest group of mountains in the central part of the Ore Mountains. The mountains lie between the Saxon village of Olbernhau and the Czech town of Litvínov and are surrounded by the valleys of the Natzschung, Schweinitz and the Flöha.

The Bernsteinberg was Station No. 13 in the 1860s, a primary station of the Royal Saxon Survey ( Königlich-Sächsische Triangulation).

The Medvědí skála is difficult to climb because it is partly surrounded by mountain bogs and there are no established paths.

External links 
 http://rangiroa.sweb.cz/novaves/medvedi.html

Mountains and hills of the Czech Republic
Mountains of the Ore Mountains
Mountains under 1000 metres